Pangururan is a town and a district of the same name in North Sumatra province of Indonesia and it is the seat (capital) of Samosir Regency, and the largest town on Samosir Island. Its population at the 2020 Census was 34,209.

Climate
Pangururan has a cool tropical rainforest climate (Af) due to altitude with moderate rainfall from June to August and heavy rainfall in the remaining months.

References

Populated places in North Sumatra
Regency seats of North Sumatra